Newcastle-under-Lyme School is a mixed Private day school in the town of Newcastle-under-Lyme in Staffordshire, England. It came about by a merger of the old Newcastle High School (founded in 1874) with the Orme Girls' School (founded in 1876). Earlier predecessors date back over 400 years.

Present day
The school nowadays consists of nursery and preparatory departments, a senior school and a sixth form. It takes boys and girls from the ages of 3–18. The current Headmaster is Michael Getty.

The school belongs to the Headmasters' and Headmistresses' Conference (HMC). It is one of the top 100 performing schools in England in terms of its A-level results, and managed record GCSE pass levels in 2020.

Notable former pupils
In birth order:

William Watkiss Lloyd (1813–1893), writer and scholar
T. E. Hulme (1883–1917), writer
George Wade (1891–1986), pottery manufacturer
Camilla Wedgwood (1901–1955), anthropologist
Frank Barlow (1911–2009), historian
Kenneth H. Roscoe (1914–1970), soil engineer
John Wain (1925–1994), writer, poet and academic
Peter G. "Spam" Hammersley CB OBE (1928–2020), Rear Admiral, Royal Navy
Clifford Boulton (1930–2015), parliamentary official
Rosemary O'Day, née Brookes, (born 1945), historian and author
Alan Sinclair (born 1952), diabetologist and clinical scientist
Robert Sinclair MacKay (born 1956), mathematician
David J. C. MacKay (1967–2016), academic engineer
Roger Johnson (born 1970), TV newsreader
Sarah Willingham (born 1973), media entrepreneur
Dominic Burgess (born 1982), TV and film actor
Dan Robson (born 1992), rugby player for Wasps RFC and England
Geraint Vincent (living), TV journalist

Gallery

References

Educational institutions established in the 1600s
Educational institutions established in 1874
Member schools of the Headmasters' and Headmistresses' Conference
Newcastle-under-Lyme
Private schools in Staffordshire

1874 establishments in England